Campello may refer to:

El Campello, Costa Blanca, Spain
Campello, Switzerland in the canton of Ticino
Campello sul Clitunno, Province of Perugia, Italy
Campello (MBTA station), a railway station in Massachusetts, in the Campello section of the city of Brockton

People with the surname
F. Lennox Campello (born 1956), American artist, art critic and author
Tereza Campello (born 1962), Brazilian economist